Pilbara and Kimberley Aboriginal Media (PAKAM) is an Indigenous media association based in Broome, Western Australia. PAKAM broadcasts into the northern Pilbara and the Kimberley regions. As an Indigenous media producer, PAKAM relies on and covers content within the Kimberley region and the communities within. Their service also enables the sharing of news, information, media, music, culture and broadcast events throughout their area coverage. They cover over a million square kilometres of Northwestern Australia and re-transmit their programs full-time to an audience of approximately 5,000 listeners.

Awards

 13th National Remote Indigenous Media Festival.
 Leanna Shoveller, Steve McGregor Award for Best Emerging Talent
 Kapululangu Nakarra Nakarra Dreaming Track Trip, Best Cultural Video
 Sunday Island – Amy Hunter, Best Oral History
 KIS Promo, Best Commissioned Video
 Shall we Dance, Yirrman Project – Leanna Shoveller, ICTV Award for Best Editing
 Djarindjin Women’s Art for Country, Special Award
 Ian Waina, Best Emerging Radio Talent
 Trevor Ishiguschi, Best RIBS Operator

References

Broome, Western Australia
Indigenous Australian radio
News and talk radio stations in Australia
Radio broadcasting companies of Australia
Film production companies of Australia
Radio stations in Western Australia